Coex may refer to:
 Coex (material), a biopolymer with flame-retardant properties
 COEX, another name for the World Trade Center Seoul
 COEX Convention & Exhibition Center
 Coëx, a commune in Vendée, France